According to the USGS Geographical Names Information Service, there are thirty-one peaks in the United States named Stone Mountain:

References